The 1939 Louisiana Normal Demons football team represented Northwestern State University in the 1939 college football season. Louisiana Normal finished with an 11–0 record and claimed the Louisiana Intercollegiate Conference championship.

Schedule

References

Louisiana Normal
Northwestern State Demons football seasons
College football undefeated seasons
Louisiana Normal Demons football